This article lists feature-length Hong Kong films released in 2023.

Box office
The highest-grossing Hong Kong films released in 2023, by domestic box office gross revenue, are as follows:

(List of 2023 box office number-one films in Hong Kong)

Releases

See also
 2023 in Hong Kong
 List of 2023 box office number-one films in Hong Kong
 List of Hong Kong films of 2022

References

External links

 IMDb list of Hong Kong films 

2023
Films
Hong Kong
Hong Kong
Hong Kong film-related lists